Tarwin was a railway station on the South Gippsland line in South Gippsland, Victoria. The station was opened during the 1890s, and operated until its closure on 31 July 1976. Prior to its closure, in 1974, it began operating under no-one-in-charge conditions.

All that remains of the station is the platform mound, and a trestle bridge on the down end of the station site, which is now part of the Great Southern Rail Trail.

References

Disused railway stations in Victoria (Australia)
Transport in Gippsland (region)
Shire of South Gippsland